The Archdeacon of Stow and Lindsey is a senior ecclesiastical officer in the Church of England Diocese of Lincoln.

History
The Archdeaconry of Stow is an ancient division of Lincoln diocese; the first archdeacons are recorded from around 1092 (the time around which archdeacons were first appointed across the English church) and were among eight archdeacons in the exceptionally large diocese. The Archdeaconry of Lindsey was created on 22 December 1933 from the Stow archdeaconry and merged back into the Archdeaconry of Stow in 1994. The merged archdeaconry was named "the Archdeaconry of Stow and Lindsey".

List of archdeacons

High Medieval
Some of the earliest archdeacons are occasionally referred to by several variations of the title, including Archdeacon of the West Riding (of Lindsey), and of Lindsey.
bef. 1092 – ?: Hugh
bef. 1133 – bef. 1134: Osbert (son of Hugh)
bef. 1134 – aft. 1152: William son of Osbert
bef. 1158 – bef. 1161: Roger de Almaria
bef. 1161 – bef. 1187: Richard de Almaria
bef. 1187 – aft. 1200: Alexander
bef. 1200 – aft. 1208: William de Firsby
bef. 1214 – aft. 1219 (res.): William de Thornaco (became Archdeacon of Lincoln)
bef. 1219 – bef. September 1219 (res.): John of York
bef. September 1219 – aft. 1222: Hugh de Sancto Edwardo
bef. 1223 – 10 November 1223 (d.): William son of Fulk II
bef. 1224 – aft. 1236: William of Canterbury
bef. 1239 – bef. 1240: W.
bef. 1240 – aft. 1241: Gilbert
bef. 1242 – aft. 1262: Michael de Benington
bef. 1264 – aft. 1279: Simon de Barton
bef. 1280 – aft. 1285: Antony de Sauzthorp
bef. 1289 – aft. 1291: Durand of Lincoln
30 December 1291 – bef. 1301 (res.): Joceline Kirmington

Late Medieval
13 January 1301 – 1301 (res.): William Ockham
13 July 1301 – bef. 1303 (d.): William Langwath
30 December 1303 – bef. September 1320: William Ockham (again)
26 January – bef. June 1320 (res.): Adam de Brome (ineffective royal grant)
16 June 1320 (grant): Richard Northwode (ineffective royal grant)
? – bef. 1332 (res.): Walter Stauren
9 January – 8 February 1332 (exch.): John Islip
8 February – 25 December 1332 (res.) & 1–5 January 1333 (exch.): Simon Islip
5 January 1333 – bef. 1334 (d.): John Nassington
6 November 1334 – bef. 1335 (res.): John Ragenhill or John Longespey de Regenhill
19 March – 9 April 1335 (exch.): Thomas Ripplingham
9 April 1335 – bef. 1339 (d.): John Bekingham
17 February 1339 – 31 December 1346 (exch.): Henry Chaddesden
31 December 1346 – ?: Henry Motoun
? – 1 March 1386 (exch.): Thomas Chandos
1 March 1386 – 7 June 1401 (d.): Thomas Aston
bef. 1402 – bef. 1419 (d.): Hugh Hanworth
18 March 1419 – bef. 1427 (res.): Thomas Brouns (became Archdeacon of Berkshire)
8 July 1427 – bef. 1433 (res.): Stephen Wilton
29 May 1434 – 1442 (res.): William Lyndwood (became Bishop of St David's)
bef. 1443 – 1448 (res.): William Scrope
? – 1452 (d.): Peter Irford or Beverlay
10 April – bef. September 1452 (res.): Lawrence Booth
20 September 1452 – 12 November 1454 (exch.): Edmund Booth
13 November 1454 – ?: William Witham
15 December 1460 – 1468 (res.): John Collinson (became Archdeacon of Bedford)
7 December 1468 – 26 June 1471 (exch.): Thomas Downe
26 June 1471 – 1475: Edmund Sheriffe
23 August 1477 – 1478 (res.): John Blithe (became Archdeacon of Huntingdon)
14 November 1477 – 8 December 1496 (d.): William Sheffield
20 May 1497 – ?: Robert Frost
24 November 1506 – bef. 1507 (d.): William Smith
14 December 1507 – 9 January 1543 (d.): Edward Derby

Early modern
15 January – July 1543 (res.): Anthony Draycot (became Archdeacon of Huntingdon)
24 August 1543 – 8 March 1553 (d.): Christopher Massingberd
June 1553 – bef. 1554 (deprived): John Aylmer (deprived)
29 March 1554 – bef. 1559 (deprived): John Harrison (deprived)
1559 – 1562 (res.): John Aylmer (restored; became Archdeacon of Lincoln)
1563 – bef. 1576 (d.): Roger Kelke
26 January 1576 – 6 March 1582 (res.): Thomas Sparke
7 March 1582 – 4 August 1610 (d.): John Fermery
16 August 1610 – 6 September 1629 (d.): Alexander Chapman
14 September 1610 – bef. 1610: John Hills (failed installation)
14 September 1629 – bef. 1641 (d.): Nicholas Walker
14 August – 21 November 1641 (res.): James Duport
15 November 1641 – bef. 1677 (d.): Stephen Luddington
3 March 1677 – 1683 (res.): Byrom Eaton (became Archdeacon of Leicester)
5 September 1683 – 1684 (res.): John Gery (became Archdeacon of Buckingham)
4 November 1684 – 29 April 1712 (d.): John Hutton
22 July 1712 – 3 September 1730 (d.): Lawrence Echard
13 November 1730 – bef. 1751 (d.): Squire Payne
26 April 1751 – bef. 1765 (d.): William Bassett
5 September 1765 – 15 March 1791 (d.): John Towne
19 March 1791 – 19 January 1808 (d.): Robert Wharton
11 March 1808 – 28 August 1823 (d.): Cayley Illingworth
29 September 1823 – 12 August 1844 (d.): Henry Bayley
14 September 1844 – 18 December 1862 (d.): William Stonehouse

Late modern
1863 – 5 February 1867 (d.): John Giles, Rector of Willoughby
1867 – 10 December 1893 (d.): Edward Trollope, Rector of Leasingham (also Bishop suffragan of Nottingham from 21 December 1877)
1894–1897 (d.): George Perry, Rector of Waddington
1897 – 14 May 1912 (d.): John Bond, Vicar of St Peter-in-Eastgate (with St Margaret, Lincoln (until 1902) then Precentor at Lincoln Cathedral (from 1902)
1912–1913 (res.): George Jeudwine, Rector of Harlaxton (became Archdeacon of Lincoln)
1913–1921 (deprived): John Wakeford, Precentor at the Cathedral (deprived)
1921–1937 (res.): Ernest Blackie, Precentor at the Cathedral (also Bishop suffragan of Grantham {1930–1935} then Bishop suffragan of Grimsby {1935–1937}; became Dean of Rochester)
In 1933, the Archdeaconry of Lindsey was split from Stow archdeaconry
1937–1951 (res.): Arthur Greaves, Bishop suffragan of Grimsby and Precentor at the Cathedral
1951–1954 (res.): Mervyn Armstrong, Rector of Epworth and of Wroot (became Provost of Leicester)
1954–1962 (ret.): Lawrence Ashcroft, Vicar of Burton-on-Stather
1963–1967 (res.): Michael Roy Sinker
1967–1975 (ret.): Sidney Harvie-Clark, Vicar of Hackthorn and Rector of Cold Hanworth (afterwards archdeacon emeritus)
1975–1989 (ret.): David Scott, Vicar of Hackthorn with Cold Hanworth (also Priest-in-Charge of North and South Carlton {from 1978})
1989–1994: Roderick Wells (became Archdeacon of Stow and Lindsey)

Archdeacons of Lindsey
1934 – 27 October 1940 (d.): Herbert Parry, Rector of Bigby
1941 – 8 September 1948 (d.): Nathaniel Railton, Rector of Bigby (until 1943) then of Potter Hanworth
1948 – 21 June 1960 (d.): Lisle Marsden, Vicar of Great Grimsby (until 1951) then a canon residentiary
1960–1971 (ret.): Clifford Jarvis, a canon residentiary (afterwards archdeacon emeritus)
1971 – 29 September 1984 (d.): Bill Dudman, a canon residentiary
1985–1994 (ret.): Christopher Laurence (afterwards archdeacon emeritus)

Archdeacons of Stow and Lindsey
1994–2001 (ret.): Roderick Wells (or Archdeacon of Stow and Archdeacon of Lindsey; previously Archdeacon of Stow; afterwards archdeacon emeritus)
2001–2006 (res.): Tim Ellis (became Bishop suffragan of Grantham)
April 20077 September 2014 (res.): Jane Sinclair
10 October 20152022 (ret.): Mark Steadman
18 July 2022present: Aly Buxton

Notes

References

Sources

Lists of Anglicans
 
Lists of English people